GLB may refer to:

 Gay, lesbian and bisexual
 Girls' Life Brigade, a constituent organization of the Girls' Brigade
 Gramm–Leach–Bliley Act of the United States Congress
 Grant Lee Buffalo, an American rock band
 Greatest lower bound
 Great Leap Brewing, a Chinese brewery
 Mercedes-Benz GLB, a sport utility vehicle
 San Carlos Apache Airport, in Arizona, United States
 GLB file format (.glb), the binary form of glTF
 Union of Workers in Food and Allied Industries, a former Austrian trade union
 Gothic & Lolita Bible, a Japanese fashion magazine and book